Greenbottom is a hamlet in the parish of Kenwyn in Cornwall, England, United Kingdom. Greenbottom is located on the Penstraze Moor between Saveock Water and Threemilestone, near the A390. It is situated south east of Penstraze.

References

Hamlets in Cornwall